Kapurush, English title The Coward, is a 1965 Indian drama film directed by Satyajit Ray.

Plot

Amitabha Ray is a Calcutta-based scriptwriter who is driving around in the country to collect material for a film. His vehicle breaks down in a small town. A tea planter, Bimal Gupta, offers hospitality for the night, and Amitabha accepts. At Gupta's house, he is introduced to his wife Karuna. Amitabha is shocked to find her to be the girl he once loved and had let down during their student days. Unaware of their past relationship, Gupta entertains Amitabha and gets drunk. 

Unable to sleep, Amitabha remembers the last time he saw Karuna. Forced to leave town with her uncle who did not approve of the relationship, Karuna came to see Amitabha, offering to sacrifice her comfortable life and educational plans to marry him. Amitabha, however, proved to be a coward, unwilling to make such a commitment. Back in the present, he asks for sleeping pills from Karuna, and asks if she is happy with her husband, to which she gives no definite answer.

The next morning, Amitabha decides to take the train instead of waiting for his vehicle to be repaired. Gupta drives him to the train station in his car, accompanied by his wife. After a picnic which the trio has on its way, Gupta falls asleep. Amitabha tells Karuna that he loves her and asks her to leave her husband for him. Karuna, however, does or says little to encourage him. As Gupta is about to wake up, Amitabha writes a note to Karuna, telling her to come to the railway station later if she still cares for him.

Gupta drops Amitabha off at the station. Amitabha falls asleep; when he awakens, he is approached by Karuna, thinking that she wants to go with him, but all she asks for is to return the sleeping pills which she gave him.

Cast
 Soumitra Chatterjee as Amitabha Ray
 Madhabi Mukherjee as Karuna
 Haradhan Bandopadhyay as Bimal Gupta

Preservation
The Academy Film Archive preserved Kapurush in 2005.

References

External links
 Kapurush (SatyajitRay.org)
 

1965 films
1965 drama films
1960s Bengali-language films
Bengali-language Indian films
Films based on short fiction
Films directed by Satyajit Ray
Films with screenplays by Satyajit Ray
Films set in Kolkata